The 40th Air Division is an inactive United States Air Force unit. Its last assignment was with Fifteenth Air Force at Malmstrom Air Force Base, Montana. It was inactivated on 14 June 1991.

As the 40th Bombardment Wing, the unit was one of the primary B-17 Flying Fortress heavy strategic bombardment wings of VIII Bomber Command and later, Eighth Air Force in World War II.

History
The 40th Bomb Wing was established on 15 January 1943 and officially activated on 21 January 1943. In May of that year, the Wing deployed to Brampton Grange, England. During the war, the wing went through a succession of name changes starting on 3 May 1943 when they were redesignated the 40 Bombardment Wing (Heavy). This was quickly followed by another change on 30 August 1943 when they were redesignated the 40 Combat Bombardment Wing (Heavy). In September 1943, the wing received three bombardment groups and began combat operations against Nazi Germany, striking such targets as Nantes, Emden, Wilhelmshaven, and Bremen. Its units participated in a mission to Schweinfurt on 14 October 1943 that resulted in the loss of over half of the aircraft dispatched. The final name change came on 13 August 1943 when they became 40 Combat Bombardment Wing, Heavy. For the remainder of World War II, the wing flew numerous missions against military targets throughout occupied Europe and Germany. Following the end of the war the Wing was inactivated on 25 December 1946.

"Redesignated the 40th Air Division in March 1951, it assumed a supervisory role over assigned units of the Strategic Air Command, ensuring that they were manned, trained, and equipped to conduct long range bombardment missions using either nuclear or conventional weapons. It also developed and maintained the capability for effective air refueling and Minuteman II (intercontinental ballistic missile) operations. In these roles the division conducted staff assistance visits and participated in numerous exercises such as Buy None, Buckskin Rider and Busy Player."

"After July 1989, the 40th Air Division established policies to ensure support for wartime execution of a strategic ICBM wing and a strategic air refueling wing in accordance with the Single Integrated Operational Plan and Joint Chiefs of Staff directed conventional war-fighting commitments."

Lineage
 Established as the 40th Bombardment Wing on 15 January 1943
 Activated on 21 January 1943
 Redesignated: 40th Bombardment Wing (Heavy) on 3 May 1943
 Redesignated: 40th Combat Bombardment Wing (Heavy) on 30 August 1943
 Redesignated: 40th Combat Bombardment Wing, Heavy on 13 August 1944
 Redesignated: 40th Bombardment Wing, Heavy on 9 June 1945
 Inactivated on 25 December 1946
 Redesignated 40th Air Division on 2 March 1951
 Organized on 14 March 1951
 Discontinued on 1 July 1952
 Activated on 1 July 1952
 Inactivated on 1 April 1957
 Activated on 1 July 1959
 Inactivated on 8 June 1988
 Activated on 7 July 1989
 Inactivated on 14 June 1991

Assignments
 Third Air Force, 21 January 1943
 Eighth Air Force, 6 June 1943
 VIII Bomber Command, 8 June 1943
 1st Bombardment Division (later 1 Air Division), 13 September 1943
 United States Air Forces in Europe, c. 31 October 1945
 European Air Materiel Command, 20 – 25 December 1946
 Second Air Force, 14 March 1951 – 1 April 1957
 Second Air Force, 1 July 1959
 Eighth Air Force, 1 January 1975 – 8 June 1988
 Fifteenth Air Force, 7 July 1989 – 14 June 1991

Components

Wings
 17th Bombardment Wing: 1 February – 1 July 1963; 1 July 1971 – 1 July 1973
 31st Fighter-Escort Wing (later 31st Strategic Fighter Wing): 14 March 1951 – 1 July 1952; 1 July 1952 – 1 April 1957 (detached 10 July – 11 October 1952 and 10 November 1953 – 12 February 1954)
 108th Fighter Wing: 14 March – 16 November 1951
 146th Fighter Wing: 17 April – c. 1 September 1951
 301st Air Refueling Wing: 2 July 1966 – 31 March 1970; 1 July 1973 – 1 July 1975; 7 July 1989 – 14 June 1991
 305th Air Refueling Wing: 1 July 1973 – 1 December 1982
 341st Strategic Missile Wing: 7 July 1989 – 14 June 1991
 351st Strategic Missile Wing: 1 July 1973 – 1 December 1982
 379th Bombardment Wing: 9 January 1961 – 8 June 1988

 410th Bombardment Wing: 1 February 1963 – 1 September 1964; 31 March 1970 – 8 January 1988
 416th Bombardment Wing: 30 June 1971 – 1 July 1973; 1 December 1982 – 8 June 1988
 449th Bombardment Wing: 1 February 1963 – 30 September 1977
 499th Air Refueling Wing: 1 February 1963 – 30 September 1977
 500th Air Refueling Wing: 1 July 1963 – 15 December 1964
 508th Fighter-Escort Wing (later 508 Strategic Fighter Wing): 1 July 1952 – 11 May 1956 (detached c. 8 February -c. 13 May 1953 and 12 February-c. 7 May 1954)
 4026th Strategic Wing: 1 July 1959 – 9 January 1961
 4042d Strategic Wing: 1 July 1959 – 1 February 1963
 4043d Strategic Wing: 1 July 1959 – 1 February 1963
 4080th Strategic Reconnaissance Wing: 1 May 1956 – 1 April 1957
 4239th Strategic Wing: 1 July 1959 – 1 February 1963

Groups
 2d Bombardment Group, 15 December 1945 – 28 February 1946
 92d Bombardment Group, 13 September 1943 – 28 February 1946
 305th Bombardment Group, 13 September 1943 – 16 May 1945; 31 December 1945 – 25 December 1946
 306th Bombardment Group, 13 September 1943 – 16 May 1945; 16 December 1945 – 25 December 1946
 384th Bombardment Group, 31 May 1945 – 28 February 1946
 492d Bombardment Group, by 31 October 1944-c. May 1945

Squadron
 100th Air Refueling Squadron: 20 January – 23 May 1953; 24 – 25 November 1953

Stations

 MacDill Field, Florida, 21 January–May 1943
 Brampton Grange (AAF-103), England, 6 June 1943
 RAF Thurleigh (AAF-111), England, c. 16 September 1943
 Istres-Le Tubé Airfield (Y-17), France, 26 June 1945

 AAF Station Erlangen, Germany, 15 November 1945 – 25 December 1946
 Turner Air Force Base, Georgia, 14 March 1951 – 1 July 1952; 1 July 1952 – 1 April 1957
 Wurtsmith Air Force Base, Michigan, 1 July 1959 – 8 June 1988
 Malmstrom Air Force Base, Montana, 7 July 1989 – 14 June 1991

Aircraft and Missiles

 Boeing B-17 Flying Fortress, 1943–1946
 Consolidated B-24 Liberator, 1944–1945
 Douglas C-47 Skytrain, 1944–1945
 Douglas A-26 Invader, 1945
 North American P-51 Mustang, 1945
 de Havilland Mosquito, 1945
 Republic F-84 Thunderjet, 1951–1957
 Boeing KB-29 Superfortress, 1953–1956

 Martin B-57 Canberra, 1956–1957
 Boeing B-52 Stratofortress, 1961–1988
 KC-135 Stratotanker, 1961–1988, 1989–1991
 Boeing KC-97 Stratofreighter, 1963–1964
 Minuteman-II (LGM-30F), 1973–1988, 1989–1991
 Minuteman-III (LGM-30G), 1989–1991

See also
 List of United States Air Force air divisions

References

Notes

Bibliography

 
 

040
Units and formations of Strategic Air Command
Bombardment units and formations of the United States Air Force